Stoke was a borough constituency in Stoke-on-Trent which returned one Member of Parliament (MP)  to the House of Commons of the UK Parliament, a new name and form of a seat which had existed from the Reform Act 1832. Elections were held using the first past the post voting system.

History 
The constituency was created for the 1918 general election, and abolished for the 1950 general election.

Members of Parliament

Election results

Elections in the 1910s

Elections in the 1920s

Elections in the 1930s

Elections in the 1940s 
General Election 1939–40:

Another General Election was required to take place before the end of 1940. The political parties had been making preparations for an election to take place from 1939 and by the end of this year, the following candidates had been selected; 
Labour: Ellis Smith

References 

Parliamentary constituencies in Stoke-on-Trent (historic)
Constituencies of the Parliament of the United Kingdom established in 1918
Constituencies of the Parliament of the United Kingdom disestablished in 1950